Antony Kenneth Evans (born 23 September 1998) is an English professional footballer who plays as an attacking midfielder for Bristol Rovers.

Club career
Evans joined the Everton academy at the age of nine after previously training with Liverpool. He signed a professional contract with the Toffees in October 2015. In January 2017 Evans joined League Two side Morecambe on loan for the rest of the 2016–17 season. He made his professional debut on 4 February 2017 in a 1–1 draw away at Doncaster Rovers.

In January 2019, he joined Blackpool on loan until the end of the season.

On 29 January 2020, Evans joined Bundesliga side SC Paderborn 07 on a two-and-a-half year deal.

On 23 January 2021, Evans joined League One side Crewe Alexandra on loan for the remainder of the 2020–21 season, making his debut in a 4–1 defeat at Gillingham on 26 January.

On 20 August 2021, Evans was released by SC Paderborn.

Bristol Rovers
On 31 August 2021, Evans joined recently relegated League Two side Bristol Rovers on a one-year deal. He made his debut for the club that weekend, setting up the only goal of the game with a cross from the right-hand side, assisting fellow Deadline Day signing Leon Clarke as his new club defeated Crawley Town. On 9 October 2021, he opened his account for the club with the first goal in a 3–0 win over Carlisle United. On the final day of the League Two season, Evans took his league tally to ten goals for the season, as well as reaching twelve assists, as Rovers thrashed Scunthorpe United 7–0 to match Northampton Town's goal difference and overtake them on a goals scored basis, Rovers taking the final automatic promotion place in dramatic fashion. He was also awarded the club's goal of the season award for his long-range late strike against Barrow. In June 2022, after weeks of speculation, Evans signed a new three-year contract with the club.

International career
Evans has represented England at under-19 level, playing against the Netherlands and Belgium.

Career statistics

Honours
Bristol Rovers
EFL League Two third-place promotion: 2021–22

References

External links

Living people
1998 births
English footballers
Everton F.C. players
Morecambe F.C. players
English Football League players
Association football wingers
Blackpool F.C. players
SC Paderborn 07 players
Crewe Alexandra F.C. players
Bristol Rovers F.C. players
England youth international footballers
Bundesliga players
2. Bundesliga players
Footballers from Liverpool
English expatriate footballers
English expatriate sportspeople in Germany
Expatriate footballers in Germany